This is a list of the extreme points of Australia (the country, not the continent). The list includes extremes of cardinal direction, elevation, and other points of peculiar geographic interest. The location of some points depend on whether islands and the Australian Antarctic Territory (which is not universally recognised) are included.

Northernmost point
 Bramble Cay, Torres Strait Islands, Queensland (9°8'23" S)
 Continental Australia: Cape York, Cape York Peninsula, Queensland (10°41' S)

Southernmost point
 Bishop and Clerk Islets, Tasmania (55°03' S)
 Tasmania main island: South East Cape, (43°38' S) 
 Continental Australia: South Point, Wilsons Promontory, Victoria (39°08' S)

Easternmost point
 Steels Point, Norfolk Island (167°57' E)
 Excluding external territories: Ball's Pyramid, New South Wales (159°15' E)
 Continental Australia: Cape Byron, New South Wales (153°38' E)

Westernmost point
 Meyer Rock, McDonald Islands (72°34' E)
 Excluding external territories: Dirk Hartog Island, Western Australia (112°56' E)
 Continental Australia: Steep Point, Western Australia (113°09' E)

Highest point
 Mawson Peak, Heard Island
 Continental Australia: Mount Kosciuszko, New South Wales
Furthest point from the centre of the earth: Thornton Peak, Queensland (6,377.866 kilometres)
Tallest Mountain, as measured from ocean floor: Mount Hamilton, Macquarie Island (5,000 + metres)
Including Australian Antarctic Territory: Dome A (4,093 metres) 
Including Australian Antarctic Territory on rocky terrain: Mount McClintock,

Lowest natural point
 Kati Thanda–Lake Eyre, South Australia
Including Australian Antarctic Territory: Deep Lake, Vestfold Hills,

Other points
 Planimetric centre of gravity for continental Australia – Lambert Gravitational Centre, Northern Territory
 Furthest point from the coastline – Between Papunya and Lake Lewis, Northern Territory
Northwestern point of continental Australia - North West Cape, Western Australia
Southwestern point of continental Australia - Cape Leeuwin, Western Australia 
Northeastern point of continental Australia - Cape York, Queensland
Southeastern point - Cape Howe, New South Wales/Victoria

See also
 Centre points of Australia
 Extreme points of Earth
 Extreme points of Oceania
Pole of inaccessibility § Australia

References

Headlands of Australia
Extreme points of Australia
Australia